Milada Blekastad (1 July 1917 – 25 October 2003) was a Norwegian literary historian.

Personal life 
She was born in Prague. Her grandfather František Topič was one of the most prominent publishers in that town and often published Nordic literature; her father Jaroslav Topič was a publisher as well and her mother Milada Topičová was a translator. As a fifteen-year old, Milada Blekastad received an invitation from Gunnvor Krokann, wife of the writer Inge Krokann, to travel to Norway.  There she met the artist Hallvard Blekastad (1883–1966) whom she married in 1934. She was quick to learn nynorsk and spoke fluent Gausdal dialect, but she translated to both nynorsk and bokmål.

She had seven children.

Career 
She was a lecturer in Czech at the University of Oslo from 1957. She took the dr.philos. degree in 1969 with the thesis Comenius, Versuch eines Umrisses von Leben, Werk und Schicksal des Jan Amos Komenský. She was a Government scholar from 1970.

She wrote several academic and popular works on Comenius. Books about him include Menneskenes sak (1977), and translations include Verdsens labyrint (1955; orig. 1631) and Informatoriet for skulen hennar mor (1965).

She was a prolific translator between Czech and Norwegian, being awarded the Bastian Prize in 1969 for translating Ludvík Vaculík's The Axe. She wrote historical overviews Millom aust og vest (1958) and Millom bork og ved (1978) as well as publishing the fairytale collection Tsjekkiske og Slovakiske eventyr in four volumes between 1939 and 1955.

She was a member of the Norwegian Academy of Science and Letters  and of the Norwegian PEN Club. In 1997, she was awarded the Medal of Merit, First Grade, by the president of the Czech Republic Vaclav Havel.

References

1917 births
2003 deaths
Writers from Prague
Czechoslovak emigrants to Norway
Norwegian philologists
Slavists
Academic staff of the University of Oslo
Norwegian literary historians
Translators from Czech
Translators to Norwegian
Nynorsk-language writers
20th-century Norwegian translators
Members of the Norwegian Academy of Science and Letters
Recipients of Medal of Merit (Czech Republic)
20th-century philologists